Tumii Je Amar Maa is an Indian Bengali drama television series which premiered on 6 June 2022 on Colors Bangla and digital platform Voot. The series is produced by Snigdha Basu and Sani Ghose Ray under the banner of Acropoliis Entertainment. It stars Priya Mondal, Suman Dey and Aradhaya Biswas.

Plot 
The show revolves around a single father Aniruddha Roy Chowdhury, a simple girl Arohi and Aniruddha's daughter Arohi 'Aru' Chowdhury.

Aru desperately searches for her mother. Later, Aru wished that Arohi become her mother but Aniruddha doesn't want to remarry. Aru is kidnapped, but Arohi saves her while Aniruddha starts a police investigation to find Aru and mistakenly believes that Arohi kidnapped his daughter, so Arohi is arrested.

Later, Arohi is soon to marry Manik but with the help of Aniruddha, Aru kidnaps her to prevent the wedding. Shibani asks Arohi to work in her house, to befriend little Aru but Arohi feels that it's a governess job. Later, she accepts the job.

Cast

Main
Suman Dey as Aniruddha Roy Chowdhury – Aru's father and Riddhima's husband (2022 – present)
Priya Mondal as Aarohi Chakraborty – Aru's foster mother, Manik's ex-fiancée (2022 – present)
Aradhya Biswas as Aarohi 'Aru' Chowdhury – Aniruddha and Riddhima's daughter (2022 – present)
Roshni Tanwi Bhattacharya as Riddhima – Aru's biological mother and Aniruddha's long-lost wife (2022 – present)

Recurring
Mallika Majumder as Shibani Roy Chowdhury – Aniruddha's aunt, Aru's grandmother (2022 – present)
Pritha Chatterjee (2022 – present)
Subhrajit Dutta (2022 – present)
Suchismita Chowdhury (2022 – present)
Ayush Adhikari -as Tuban Chackroborty - Arohi’s brother , Aru’s Uncle , Mitali’s Son (2022- Present )
Minakshi Ghosh (2022 – present)
Sulagna Chatterjee (2022 – present)
Shirsha Guhathakurta (2022 – present)
Piyali Sasmal (2022 – present)
Ankita Bhrama (2022- present)
Suban Roy (2022- present)
Gopa Nandi (2022- present)

References

External links

 Tumii Je Amar Maa at Voot

Colors Bangla original programming
2022 Indian television series debuts
Indian drama television series
Bengali-language television programming in India